The D.T. Porter Building in Memphis, Tennessee was constructed in 1895 and was the city's first steel frame skyscraper. It had a circulating hot water heating system. It was renovated in 1983 and converted to condominiums. It was listed on the National Register of Historic Places for Shelby County, Tennessee in 1995. It was designed by Edward Culliatt Jones's architecture firm.

See also
 National Register of Historic Places listings in Shelby County, Tennessee

References

Office buildings on the National Register of Historic Places in Tennessee
Romanesque Revival architecture in Tennessee
Office buildings completed in 1894
Residential skyscrapers in Memphis, Tennessee
Residential condominiums in the United States
National Register of Historic Places in Memphis, Tennessee